San Antonio International Airport  is an international airport in San Antonio, Texas. SAT averages 260 daily departures and arrivals at its 24 gates, which serve 12 airlines flying non-stop to 53 destinations in the US and Mexico.

History
San Antonio International Airport was founded in 1941 when the City of San Antonio purchased  of undeveloped land that was then north of the city limits (now part of the city's Uptown District) for a project to be called "San Antonio Municipal Airport."  World War II wartime needs meant the unfinished airport was pressed into federal government service. The airport opened in July 1942 as Alamo Field and was used by the United States Army Air Forces as a training base.

The 77th Reconnaissance Group, equipped with various aircraft (P-39, P-40, A-20, B-25, O-47, O-52, and L-5) trained reconnaissance personnel who later served overseas. One squadron (113th) flew antisubmarine patrols over the Gulf of Mexico.

At the end of the war the airfield was no longer needed by the military and was turned over to the City of San Antonio for civil use.

Terminal 2 was built in 1951–53, along with the FAA control tower and a baggage claim area. For HemisFair '68, a new satellite concourse was built, containing eight jet bridge gates and passenger waiting areas.

In 1975 the city adopted its first Airport Master Plan with plans for a new 1,300 space parking garage and a new  Terminal (formerly called Terminal 1, now called Terminal A). Once the new terminal was completed in 1984 it brought the airport's capacity up from eight gates to 27 gates. In 1986 a new  FAA Air Traffic Control Tower was built at a new location.

In 1994 a second Airport Master Plan was developed that would take the airport into the 21st century. This plan included major updates for the airport: more parking spaces in a 3,000 space parking garage to be completed by 2007, improved airport access and an improved concession program. Two new terminals were planned to replace Terminal 2, to increase the airports gate count to 35.

San Antonio boarded over 3.5 million passenger in 1999. Since 1966, the airport has boarded more than 80 million people.

From February to September 2006, the airport was a focus city for United Airlines (the airline called it a "hublet") with flights to 12 cities in conjunction with their partner Trans States Airlines. Trans States Airlines redeployed their aircraft elsewhere, eliminating service to seven cities. Mexicana celebrated 50 years serving the airport in September 2007, but suspended service to San Antonio in August 2010 when the airline went bankrupt and suspended operations.

On November 9, 2010, the original Terminal 2 closed, and Terminal B opened. Terminal 1 was then renamed Terminal A. The removal of fixtures in the old Terminal 2 began in January 2011. Final demolition of Terminal 2 was in May 2011.

In 2013, the SAT Customs and Border Protection became a Global Entry enrollment center.

In June 2015, it was announced that the 3-story short-term parking garage, which was over 30 years old, would be closed and demolished in order to make way for a new 7-story parking garage and Consolidated Rental Car Center. Work began in early 2017 on the 1.8 million square feet facility, which was planned to house up to 14 rental car brands and short-term public parking. The public parking portion was completed in April 2017, and the rental car portion opened in January 2018.

Facilities

Terminals

San Antonio International Airport has two terminals with an overall 24 jet bridge gates. The original one-level terminal (formerly Terminal 2) opened in 1953 with ground-loading holding areas and was expanded twice, once in 1959 with new east and west wings, and again in 1968 with an eight-gate satellite concourse, which was built to handle visitors to HemisFair '68. Terminal 2 closed on November 9, 2010 as the new Terminal B opened, and Terminal 2 began to be demolished in March 2011, with completion in January 2012. A second terminal (now Terminal A) opened in 1984 with a 16-gate concourse. The U.S. Customs and Border Protection facility is located in Terminal A.

Terminal A is the larger of the two concourses with 17 gates in total. All international carriers operate out of Terminal A. On June 18, 2014, a $35.6 million renovation was completed for this terminal, with the most visible improvements to passengers being new terrazzo floors, updated food courts, and new signage. On October 15, 2014, all gates in Terminal A were renumbered in sequential order. Eight carriers operate from Terminal A, with 15 of the 17 gates in use.

Terminal B, which opened in November 2010, contains 8 gates. Corgan Associates, Inc. and 3D/International designed the new terminal. American and Continental were the two original airlines at Terminal B. United, at the time located in Terminal A, moved into Terminal B on August 1, 2012 during the merger with Continental. A United Club is located between gates B3 and B5. The USO is located on the bottom level of Terminal B next to baggage claim.

Airlines and destinations

Passenger

Cargo

Statistics

Passenger numbers

Top destinations

Accidents and incidents
 On January 31, 1967, a Saturn Airways DC-6 was operating on a cargo flight to Kelly AFB. The crew decided to divert to San Antonio International Airport and commenced the approach. All 3 occupants were killed.
 On October 29, 2012, Interjet Flight 2953, scheduled to Mexico City International Airport, made an emergency landing at San Antonio after suffering engine sputtering problems that was caused by a bird strike. No injuries or fatalities were reported.
On November 15, 2019, a Cessna 525 Citation arriving from San Jose International Airport collided with a parked Cessna 560 Citation during taxi to a service center. No injuries were reported.
On December 1, 2019, a Piper PA-24 Comanche en route to Boerne from Sugar Land crashed in a neighborhood while attempting an emergency landing at the airport. While there were no injuries on the ground, the 3 occupants of the aircraft were killed.

See also

 Texas World War II Army Airfields
 Stinson Municipal Airport

References

External links

San Antonio International Airport Website, official site
San Antonio Multi-User Flight Information Display – Arrivals
San Antonio Multi-User Flight Information Display – Departures
San Antonio Intl Airport Group

OAG Schedules for SAT
Display – Management
Airport diagram for March 1962

Buildings and structures in San Antonio
Airports in Texas
Airports established in 1948
Transportation in San Antonio
Transportation in Bexar County, Texas